Paul K. Davis (born 1952) is a historian specializing in military history.

Education and career
Born in Texas, he was educated at Southwest Texas State University before earning his PhD from King's College London with a thesis on the Mesopotamian campaign of the First World War. He has been consulted as an expert military historian by the BBC and National Public Radio. He has lectured at St. Mary's University, the Alamo Colleges system, and the University of Texas at San Antonio.

Select bibliography

100 Decisive Battles: From Ancient Times to the Present  
 Besieged: An Encyclopedia of Great Sieges from Ancient Times to the Present. Santa Barbara, Calif: ABC-CLIO, 2001.  
 Encyclopedia of Invasions and Conquests from Ancient Times to the Present. Millerton, N.Y.: Grey House Pub, 2006.  
Encyclopedia of Warrior Peoples & Fighting Groups  with Allen Lee Hamilton 
Ends and Means: The British Mesopotamia Campaign and Commission, 1914-1916

References

1952 births
Living people
Alumni of King's College London
St. Mary's University, Texas faculty
University of Texas at San Antonio faculty
Texas State University alumni
American military historians
American male non-fiction writers